40 Is the New 20 is a 2009 Canadian comedy film written and directed by Simon Boisvert and starring Pat Mastroianni, Claudia Ferri, Bruce Dinsmore and Diana Lewis.

Cast
Pat Mastroianni as Gary
Claudia Ferri as Jennifer
Bruce Dinsmore as Simon
Lynne Adams as Pat
Diana Lewis as Cindy

Reception
The film has a 33% rating on Rotten Tomatoes, based on six reviews with an average rating of 4.04/10.

References

External links
 
 

Canadian comedy films
English-language Canadian films
2000s English-language films
2000s Canadian films
English-language comedy films